was a town located in Ama District, Aichi Prefecture, Japan.

As of 2004, the town had an estimated population of 23,345 and a density of 2,099.37 persons per km². The total area was 11.12 km².

On April 1, 2005, Saori was merged with the town of Saya, and the villages of Hachikai and Tatsuta (all from Ama District), was merged to create the city Aisai.

Dissolved municipalities of Aichi Prefecture
Aisai, Aichi